David Wong is an American philosopher. He is the Susan Fox Beischer and George D. Beischer Professor of Philosophy at Duke University. Wong has done work in ethics, moral psychology, comparative ethics, and Chinese philosophy.  He is especially well known for his defense of a version of moral relativism.

Wong earned his Ph.D. from Princeton University in 1977 under the supervision of Gilbert Harman and his Bachelor of Arts degree from Macalester College in 1971.

He is the author of the book Natural Moralities.

Writings
Natural Moralities (October 2006), Oxford University Press, 2006 (Korean and Chinese translations in preparation).
"Identifying with the Nonhuman in Early Daoism", Journal of Chinese Philosophy (accepted, 2009). Written for a symposium at Oxford University in June 2006, Topics in Comparative Ancient Philosophy: Greek and Chinese
"Moral Ambivalence and Relativism", Relativism: A Compendium (accepted, 2009).
"Cultural Pluralism and Moral Identity", Moral Self-Identity and Character (accepted, 2009).
"Emotion and the Cognition of Reasons in Moral Motivation", Philosophical Issues (supplementary volume on metaethics to Nous) (accepted, 2009).
"Translation of 'Zhuangzi and the Obsession with Being Right' into Chinese", Chinese Philosophy in the English-Speaking World (accepted, 2009).

External links 
David Wong's Duke page
David Wong's Book, Natural Moralities
An in-depth autobiographical interview with David Wong

21st-century American philosophers
Living people
Duke University faculty
Princeton University alumni
Macalester College alumni
Moral psychologists
Year of birth missing (living people)